The Indian National Trust for Art and Cultural Heritage (INTACH) is a non-profit charitable organisation registered under the Societies Registration Act, 1860.

In 2007, the United Nations awarded INTACH a special consultative status with United Nations Economic and Social Council.

History
INTACH was founded in 1984 in New Delhi with the vision to create a membership organisation to stimulate and spearhead heritage awareness and conservation in India.

Since 1984, INTACH has pioneered the conservation and protection of India's natural and cultural heritage and is today the largest membership organisation in the country dedicated to conservation.

Today it has chapters in 215 Indian cities, as well as chapters in Belgium and the United Kingdom.

The Memorandum of Association and Rules and Regulations of INTACH constituted the first Governing Council of the Trust with the following members: Rajiv Gandhi, Pupul Jayakar, L. K. Jha, M. G. K. Menon, Kapila Vatsyayan, Rajeev Sethi, B. K. Thapar, Martand Singh, Bilkees I. Latif, Madhavrao Scindia, and J. B. Dadachanji.

In 2007, INTACH signed a memorandum of understanding with AusHeritage, Australia's noted heritage network, to collaborate on South Asian and South East Asian regional initiatives.

Work
Among the tasks undertaken by INTACH are restoration of monuments and their management; advocacy for heritage property conservation; public awareness through heritage walks and buses; establishment of heritage clubs in schools; and holding of awareness workshop for teachers of schools and colleges and heritage walks to various unprotected sites.

Activism 
INTACH has been involved in several protests against destruction and proposed demolition of heritage structures, including Errum Manzil and Osmania Hospital in Hyderabad, and Janata Bazaar in Bengaluru.

Restoration 
Over the years, INTACH has taken up restoration and protection of hundreds of monuments that fall outside the coverage of Archaeological Survey of India and other government agencies, and at times local authorities hand over the upkeep and restoration of heritage structures to INTACH directly.

After developing Raghurajpur, Odisha, India, a place famous for its master ‘Pattachitra’ artists and ‘Gotipua’ dance troupes as a heritage village, which has now become a major rural tourist destination, it later used the same pattern to develop Padmanabhpur village, Ganjam district, Odisha, India, famous for its weavers and folk dancers, into another heritage destination.

In 2007, the government of Goa signed a memorandum of understanding (MoU) with INTACH for restoration, conservation and maintenance of 51 officially listed heritage and cultural monuments in the state. This includes the restoration and conservation of the 16th century Reis Magos Fort in Goa, then in 2008, INTACH signed anouth a memorandum of understanding with the Government of Delhi for the conservation of 92 monuments in Delhi, in the preparation of the Commonwealth Games 2010.

Logo 

The INTACH Logo, based on the anthropomorphic copper figure from Shahabad, Uttar Pradesh, belonging to the enigmatic Copper Hoards of the Ganga Valley (circa 1800—1700 BC) is the perceived brand image of INTACH. The classic simplicity and vitality of its lines make it a striking example of primitive man's creative genius.

Mission 
INTACH's mission to conserve heritage is based on the belief that living in harmony with heritage enhances the quality of life, and it is the duty of every citizen of India as laid down in the Constitution of India. The objectives spelt out in the Memorandum of Association constitute INTACH's Mandate and Vision. Its stated mission to date continues to be:
 Sensitise the public about the pluralistic cultural legacy of India
 Instill a sense of social responsibility towards preserving India's common heritage
 Protect and preserve India's living, built, and natural heritage by undertaking necessary actions and measures
 Document unprotected buildings of archaeological, architectural, historic and aesthetic significance, as well as the cultural resources, as this is the first step towards formulating conservation plans
 Develop heritage policies and regulations, and make legal interventions to protect India's heritage when necessary
 Provide expertise in the field of conservation, restoration and preservation of specific works of art; and encourage capacity-building by developing skills through training programmes
 Undertake emergency response measures during natural or man-made disasters and support the local administration whenever heritage is threatened
 Foster collaborations, Memoranda of Understanding (MoU) and partnerships with government and other national and international agencies
 Generate sponsorships for conservation and educational projects
To achieve the above-stated mission, at subsequent Visioning Exercises further measures were spelt out:
 INTACH must widen and strengthen its base so as to involve people in caring for our common heritage, as outlined in the objectives of the Memorandum of Association of the Society
 INTACH should develop into a highly competent and efficient organization of first recourse in all matters concerning Built (Architectural), Natural, Art (Material), Intangible (Living) Heritage in the country by building the requisite professional and other skills, both at its Central Office and at the Chapter level
 INTACH should strive to become the primary advisor on all matters pertaining to protection, conservation and preservation of heritage for the central government, the state governments (including institutions, agencies and organizations under them, such as the Armed Forces), and for institutions of decentralised governance such as the Panchayati Raj Institutions in the rural areas, for the urban local bodies (municipalities, metropolitan authorities, cantonment boards, etc.), and also the Corporate and Public Sectors
 INTACH should put into place an effective system of networking with other like-minded organizations and build a mutual support system

Awards
INTACH bestows the following awards:
 The Anirudh Bhargava – INTACH Environmental Award has been instituted in the memory of his son by Dr. Ranjit Bhargava, INTACH Life Member and facilitated by a grant.
 INTACH Award for Best Practices in Heritage Conservation
 The INTACH-STATE Heritage Tourism Award recognizes "inspiring and innovative work done by individuals/organization/ institutions" in a number of areas including "reuse of heritage concepts and properties for tourism purposes".

Funding 
INTACH has established chapters not only within India but also outside it. It now uses funds raised by its international chapters in Belgium and the United Kingdom, to take up restoration, conservation and protection projects of historical structures and heritage buildings across India.

INTACH UK Trust
The INTACH UK Trust, established in 1987, is a registered charity in the United Kingdom funded by the Charles Wallace bequest. The aim of this trust is to support the cause of heritage conservation in India.

Its two main activities are:
 Funding projects in India
 Providing scholarships to British scholars for heritage research projects in India

Collaborations
In recent years INTACH has been fortunate to receive support from the central government and several state governments, corporate houses and international agencies.

References

External links
  INTACH - Official Website
 Young INTACH- for students, teachers and enthusiasts

Arts organisations based in India
Cultural heritage of India
Heritage organizations
History organisations based in India
Arts organisations based in Delhi
Arts organizations established in 1984
1984 establishments in India
Asian Cultural Council grantees